Gorgyra subfacatus, the ochreous leaf sitter, is a butterfly in the family Hesperiidae. It is found in Guinea-Bissau, Guinea, Sierra Leone, Liberia, Ivory Coast, Ghana and western Nigeria. The habitat consists of forests.

Adults are attracted to flowers, such as those of Lantana species.

References

Butterflies described in 1890
Erionotini
Butterflies of Africa